The 2018 Alaska Senate election was held on Tuesday, November 6, 2018, with the primary election on August 21, 2018. Voters in the 10 districts of the Alaska Senate elected their representatives. The elections coincided with the elections for the state House.

Overview

Close races

Detailed results

District A

District C

District E

District G

District I

District K

District M

District O

District Q

District S

References

2018 Alaska elections
2018
Alaska Senate